Badminton had its debut at the 1966 Commonwealth Games and has been contested in 14 consecutive Commonwealth Games since.

Editions

History
Badminton was added to the Commonwealth Games program in 1966, as an optional sport. The sport was chosen to replace lawn bowls, due the lack of facilities at Jamaica. Having this status until the 1994 edition, when it became a mandatory sport. In the first three editions, five events were played (men's and women's singles, men's and women's doubles and mixed doubles). Between 1978 to 1990 a sixth event was in the program (the mixed team competition). Also between 1966 and 1990, one bronze medal was at stake. Between 1994 to 2002, the losers of the two semifinals also won two bronze medals. In 1998, the team events in both genres were introduced, but at the next edition the event was dropped and the mixed teams event returned. Later in 2002, the mixed team event returned. The last change to the program was in 2006, when the format and events played were reverted to the format used until 1990.

Events

Medal table

Successful national teams
Below is the gold medalists shown based by category and countries after the 2022 Commonwealth Games. England has been the most successful nation in the Commonwealth Games.

BOLD means overall winner of badminton at Commonwealth Games

 England and Malaysia were tied with three gold medals. However, Malaysia won four silver medals and England won one, thus Malaysia became the overall winner.
 India, England, and Malaysia were tied with two gold medals. However, India won three silver medals, Malaysia won two, and England won one, thus India became the overall winner.

Past winners

Individual competition

Team competition

References
Commonwealth Games medallists

 
Sports at the Commonwealth Games
Commonwealth Games